József Marosi (born 16 October 1934) is a Hungarian fencer. He won a silver medal in the team épée and a bronze in the team foil events at the 1956 Summer Olympics.

References

External links
 

1934 births
Living people
Hungarian male épée fencers
Hungarian male foil fencers
Olympic fencers of Hungary
Fencers at the 1956 Summer Olympics
Fencers at the 1960 Summer Olympics
Olympic silver medalists for Hungary
Olympic bronze medalists for Hungary
Olympic medalists in fencing
Martial artists from Budapest
Medalists at the 1956 Summer Olympics
20th-century Hungarian people